Microjulodis auratus is a fossil species of beetles in the family Buprestidae, the only species in the genus Microjulodis.

References

Prehistoric beetle genera